Göydərə (also Goydere and Goydara) is a village and municipality in the Gobustan Rayon of Azerbaijan. It has a population of 452.

References 

Populated places in Gobustan District